The Libyan Communist Party (PCL) was a communist party in Libya.

Historically, Marxism came to Libya through bourgeois intellectuals who studied abroad and through Marxists that settled from Italy.

The party was established shortly after World War II, but the Libyan authorities began a crackdown on the party shortly after the founding of the Communist Party. In November 1951, seven of its leaders were forced into exile, and the Communist Party was under police surveillance. The party's headquarters was in Benghazi. The influence of the party was limited to a small group in Cyrenaica.

Communist militants took part in student demonstrations. In 1952 the government banned all political parties, forcing the party underground. A second wave of repression came with Gaddafi coming to power in 1969 and a subsequent wave of repression against communists. In 1973, during the Libyan cultural revolution, Gaddafi stated: We must purge all the sick people who talk of Communism, atheism, who make propaganda for the Western countries and advocate capitalism. We shall put them in prison.

References 

Banned communist parties
Communism in Libya
Defunct political parties in Libya
Communist parties in Africa
Socialist parties in Libya
Political parties disestablished in 1952
Political parties with year of establishment missing
1952 disestablishments in Libya